Pahoroides is a genus of Polynesian araneomorph spiders in the family Physoglenidae that was first described by Raymond Robert Forster in 1990.

Species
 it contains eight species, found on the Polynesian Islands:
Pahoroides aucklandica Fitzgerald & Sirvid, 2011 – New Zealand
Pahoroides balli Fitzgerald & Sirvid, 2011 – New Zealand
Pahoroides confusa Fitzgerald & Sirvid, 2011 – New Zealand
Pahoroides courti Forster, 1990 – New Zealand
Pahoroides forsteri Fitzgerald & Sirvid, 2011 – New Zealand
Pahoroides gallina Fitzgerald & Sirvid, 2011 – New Zealand
Pahoroides kohukohu Fitzgerald & Sirvid, 2011 – New Zealand
Pahoroides whangarei Forster, 1990 (type) – New Zealand

See also
 List of Physoglenidae species

References

Araneomorphae genera
Physoglenidae
Spiders of New Zealand
Taxa named by Raymond Robert Forster